This is a list of rulers of Yatenga, one of the Mossi Kingdoms located in present-day Burkina Faso.

See also
Burkina Faso
Mossi states
Rulers of the Mossi state of Gurunsi
Rulers of the Mossi state of Gwiriko
Rulers of the Mossi state of Liptako
Rulers of the Mossi state of Tenkodogo
Rulers of the Mossi state of Wogodogo
Rulers of the Gurma Mossi state of Bilanga
Rulers of the Gurma Mossi state of Bilayanga
Rulers of the Gurma Mossi state of Bongandini
Rulers of the Gurma Mossi state of Con
Rulers of the Gurma Mossi state of Macakoali
Rulers of the Gurma Mossi state of Nungu
Rulers of the Gurma Mossi state of Piela
Lists of office-holders

External links 
 http://www.rulers.org/burktrad.html

Yatenga